Agrisius similis is a moth of the subfamily Arctiinae. It is found in China (Yunnan).

References

Moths described in 1991
Lithosiini
Moths of Asia